The Anacostia Arts Center is a multi-use arts space located at 1231 Good Hope Road SE in the Anacostia Historic District of Washington, D.C. The center opened its doors on June 22, 2013 during its parent organization Arch Development Corporation's annual festival, Lumen8Anacostia. The building stands on 9,300 square feet and has five galleries and boutiques along with a short term exhibition gallery called Blank Space SE.

History 
The building in which the Anacostia Arts Center currently resides was originally purchased by the Margolis family in the 1930s. The family was well-known at the time for owning a great deal of property in the area. 1231 Good Hope Road encompassed three buildings at the time, one of which was leased to the discount retail chain Woolworth for much for the 20th century.

In the 1980s Woolworths across the country started struggling financially and in May 1999 the Anacostia location went out of business. As a result, the Margolis grandchildren sold the property. Arch Development Corporation bought the site with a 15-year loan from BB&T bank and after three years of fundraising, in 2002 Arch began construction 1231 Good Hope Road to create a job training center for local residents.

In 2011 the space transitioned the lower level of the building to a small business incubator. Community residents reacted negatively to the job training center as many believed Anacostia did not need another social service agency. In response to this outcry, the upper level of the building also became an incubator for small business in January 2013. The Anacostia Arts Center in its current form opened on June 22, 2013.

Parent organization Arch Development Corporation also funded the Honfleur Gallery, which opened in 2007, so that it and the Anacostia Arts Center could serve the Ward 8 artistic community. In 2015 over 25,000 people came to either the Anacostia Arts Center or Honfleur Gallery.

References 

Arts centers in Washington, D.C.
Anacostia